The 1983 Australian Individual Speedway Championship was held at Speedway Park in Adelaide, South Australia on 21 January 1983. Sydney rider Billy Sanders won his fifth Australian Championship and his record fourth in a row.

Sanders caused a stir when he famously told the unruly crowd that after the reception he got he might consider changing nationalities. He then told the crowd to "Get Stuffed" at the end of his victory speech while being unfairly booed following the unpopular decision by Adelaide-based meeting referee Sam Bass to exclude crowd favourite Phil Crump from their heat 14 clash which ultimately Crump the title. Sanders had won the start, but Crump had moved under him in turn 2 and sent the Sydney rider crashing into the concrete wall. To that point of the meeting, Crump had easily won his previous heats as well as twice breaking the 3 lap track record, while Sanders, who was also undefeated, had only just won his opening race after trailing Gary Guglielmi until finally passing him in the final turn.

The leading local rider was Steve Baker who finished 8th with 7 points. Later in the year Baker would win the 1983 European (World) Under-21 Championship in Italy.

1983 Australian Solo Championship
 Australian Championship
 21 January 1983
  Virginia, South Australia - Speedway Park
 Referee:  Sam Bass
 Qualification: The top two riders go through to the Overseas Final in Manchester, England.

References

See also
 Australia national speedway team
 Sport in Australia
 Motorcycle Speedway

Speedway in Australia
Australia
Individual Speedway Championship